Frank Brisko (August 24, 1900 Chicago, Illinois  – November 26, 1990 Exeland, Wisconsin) was an American racecar driver.

Originally a motorcycle racer, Brisko ran in the Indianapolis 500 twelve times.  He started on the front row twice, and he led 69 laps of the 1934 race but finished ninth that year.  He also was a noted engine designer.

Indy 500 results

References

Frank Brisko obituary

1900 births
1990 deaths
Indianapolis 500 drivers
Racing drivers from Chicago